The Declaration of Constitutional Principles (known informally as the Southern Manifesto) was a document written in February and March 1956, during the 84th United States Congress, in opposition to racial integration of public places. The manifesto was signed by 19 US Senators and 82 Representatives from the South. The signatories included the entire Congressional delegations from Alabama, Arkansas, Georgia, Louisiana, Mississippi, South Carolina, and Virginia,  most of the members from Florida and North Carolina, and several members from Tennessee and Texas. All of them were from former Confederate states. Ninety-nine were Democrats; two were Republicans.

The Manifesto was drafted to counter the landmark Supreme Court 1954 ruling Brown v. Board of Education, which determined that segregation of public schools was unconstitutional. School segregation laws were some of the most enduring and best-known of the Jim Crow laws that characterized the Southern United States at the time.

"Massive resistance" to federal court orders requiring school integration was already being practiced across the South, and was not caused by the Manifesto. Senator J. William Fulbright of Arkansas had worked behind the scenes to tone down the original harsh draft. The final version did not pledge to nullify the Brown decision nor did it support extralegal resistance to desegregation. Instead, it was mostly a states' rights attack against the judicial branch for overstepping its role.

The Southern Manifesto accused the Supreme Court of "clear abuse of judicial power" and promised to use "all lawful means to bring about a reversal of this decision which is contrary to the Constitution and to prevent the use of force in its implementation." It suggested that the Tenth Amendment should limit the reach of the Supreme Court on such issues. Senators led the opposition, with Strom Thurmond writing the initial draft and Richard Russell the final version.

The states of Delaware, Maryland, West Virginia, Kentucky, and Missouri had been border states during the Civil War (i.e., slave states that remained in the Union). Oklahoma was not then a state but Indian Territory had been settled primarily by white Southerners and by Native Americans under federal removal policy, and at least 7,860 Native Americans from Indian Territory enlisted in the Confederate States Army and most Indian Territory tribal leaders aligned with the Confederacy. Prior to the Brown v. Board decision, all required segregation in their public school systems. Nonetheless, none of the 12 U.S. Senators or 39 U.S. House Representatives from these states signed the Manifesto.

Three Democratic Senators from Southern states did not sign:

 Al Gore Sr. and Estes Kefauver of Tennessee
 Senate Majority Leader Lyndon Johnson of Texas 

The following Democratic Representatives from Southern states also did not sign:

 16 of 21 Democrats from Texas, including Speaker of the House Sam Rayburn and future Speaker Jim Wright
 3 of 7 Democrats from Tennessee 
 3 of 11 Democrats from North Carolina 
 1 of 7 Democrats from Florida (Dante Fascell)

This refusal earned them the enmity for a time of their colleagues who signed.

There were seven Republican Representatives from former Confederate states. Only two signed the Manifesto: Joel Broyhill and Richard Poff of Virginia.

Key quotes 
"The unwarranted decision of the Supreme Court in the public school cases is now bearing the fruit always produced when men substitute naked power for established law."
"The original Constitution does not mention education. Neither does the 14th Amendment nor any other amendment. The debates preceding the submission of the 14th Amendment clearly show that there was no intent that it should affect the system of education maintained by the States."
"This unwarranted exercise of power by the Court, contrary to the Constitution, is creating chaos and confusion in the States principally affected. It is destroying the amicable relations between the white and Negro races that have been created through 90 years of patient effort by the good people of both races. It has planted hatred and suspicion where there has been heretofore friendship and understanding."

Signatories and non-signatories
In many southern States, signing was much more common than not signing, with signatories including the entire delegations from Alabama, Arkansas, Georgia, Louisiana, Mississippi, South Carolina, and Virginia. Those from southern states who refused to sign are noted below. Refusal to sign occurred most prominently among the Texas and Tennessee delegations; in both states, the majority of members of the US House of Representatives refused to sign.

United States Senate (in state order)

United States House of Representatives

See also
 American Civil Rights Movement
 Fourteenth Amendment to the United States Constitution
 Brown v. Board of Education
 1957 Georgia Memorial to Congress
 Massive resistance
 Racial segregation in the United States
 Solid South
 Southern Democrats
 Conservative Democrat
 84th United States Congress

Full Text

References

Further reading

External links
Manifesto text and signers from the Congressional Record

1956 in law
School segregation in the United States
Legal history of the United States
American political manifestos
History of racism in the United States
1956 in American politics
1956 in the United States
1956 documents
Civil rights movement